The discography of American pop vocal group Backstreet Boys consists of ten studio albums, 31 singles, one live album, three compilation albums and 33 music videos. As of 2019, they have sold more than 130 million records worldwide, becoming the best-selling boy band of all time. Formed in Orlando, Florida in 1993, the group consists of Nick Carter, Brian Littrell, Kevin Richardson, A.J. McLean and Howie Dorough. Richardson left the group in 2006 to pursue other interests, but rejoined in 2012. The Backstreet Boys released their debut single "We've Got It Goin' On" in 1995, which peaked at number sixty-nine on the Billboard Hot 100. The single, however, entered the top ten in many European countries. Their debut album, Backstreet Boys, was released internationally in 1996, and was certified three times platinum in Europe, and diamond in Canada. In 1997, they released their second international album, Backstreet's Back, which continued their international success. At the same time, they released their second self-titled album in the United States. It peaked at number four and eventually became the tenth best-selling album of the 1990s.

In 1999, the Backstreet Boys released their third and most successful album to date, Millennium, which entered the Billboard 200 at number one with first-week sales of 1,133,000 copies. It became the best-selling album of the year and sold over 24 million copies internationally. In the following year, they released their fourth album, Black & Blue, which also entered the Billboard 200 at number one with first-week sales of over a million copies. After the Black & Blue Tour in 2001, the Backstreet Boys entered a hiatus. They released their fifth studio album, Never Gone, in 2005. The album debuted at number three on the Billboard 200, selling over 291,000 copies in its first week of release. Never Gone's follow-up, Unbreakable, released in 2007, became their first album to not receive any certification in the United States. The following album, This Is Us, became their seventh consecutive album to make the top ten on the Billboard 200, with first-week sales of 42,000 copies. The group has also released two compilation albums, including the platinum-certified The Hits: Chapter One.

The Backstreet Boys have received a total of nine Grammy nominations, including five nominations in 2000. According to the RIAA in 2007, they were the best selling artist in the US with shipments of over 37 million albums. They are also ranked as the seventh best-selling group of the SoundScan era in the United States (nineteenth best-selling artist overall), with sales of 30,900,000 albums, and as the third best-selling artist of the SoundScan era in Canada, with sales of 4,128,000 albums.

Albums

Studio albums

Live albums

Compilation albums

Singles

As lead artist

As featured artist

Other charted songs

Videography

Home videos

Music videos

Notes

References

Discography
Discographies of American artists
Pop music group discographies